Alessi may refer to:

Alessi (surname)
Alessi Bakery
Alessi (Italian company), a kitchenware company
Alessi (JoJo's Bizarre Adventure), minor character appearing in the Japanese manga JoJo's Bizarre Adventure
Alessi Brothers, an American pop music vocal duo